Rona de Jos is a commune in Maramureș County, Maramureș, Romania. It is composed of a single village, Rona de Jos.

References

Communes in Maramureș County
Localities in Romanian Maramureș